The Schindhübel is a hill, that rises in the middle of the Palatine Forest in Germany, 5 kilometres southwest of  Elmstein.

Geography 
It is part of the central massif of this mountain range and also lies on the Palatine Watershed. This massif stretches roughly from Hochspeyer via  Johanniskreuz to the B 10 federal highway near Hauenstein. The region between Johanniskreuz and Hermersbergerhof is rather like a high plateau that is bounded by deeply incised valleys.

From the Eschkopf hill, the ridge runs northwest over the Schindhübel to the Bloskülb near the Elmstein village of Iggelbach. This ridge separates the upper tributaries of Speyerbach and Helmbach.

Viewing tower 
On top of the Schindhübel is a 17-metre-high observation tower, which was built in 1975 by an engineer unit from Speyer. From here there are views of the eastern Palatine Forest as far as the Haardt, as well as the striking mountain mass of the Donnersberg to the north and, in good visibility, the great Hornisgrinde mountain in the Northern Black Forest, 83 kilometres away to the south. To the west the view is limited by the nearby Eschkopf.

Two kilometres northwest, in the direction of the Bloskülb and Iggelbach, are the wall foundations of a forester's lodge which was allocated to the "Hunters from Electoral Palatinate" (Jäger aus Kurpfalz).

References

External links 

Mountains and hills of Rhineland-Palatinate
Mountains and hills of the Palatinate Forest
Observation towers in Rhineland-Palatinate